The 2014–15 CONCACAF Champions League group stage was played from August 5 to October 23, 2014. A total of 24 teams competed in the group stage to decide the eight teams which advanced to the championship stage of the 2014–15 CONCACAF Champions League.

Draw
The draw for the group stage was held on May 28, 2014, 19:00 EDT (UTC−4), at the InterContinental Hotel at Doral in Miami.

The 24 teams were drawn into eight groups of three, with each group containing one team from each of the three pots. The allocation of teams into pots was based on their national association and qualifying berth. Teams from the same association could not be drawn with each other in the group stage, and each group was guaranteed to contain a team from either the United States or Mexico, meaning U.S. and Mexican teams could not play each other in the group stage.

Seeding
The following were the group stage seeding of the 24 teams which qualified for the Champions League:

Notes

Format
In the group stage, each group was played on a home-and-away round-robin basis. The winners of each group advanced to the championship stage.

Tiebreakers
The teams were ranked according to points (3 points for a win, 1 point for a draw, 0 points for a loss). If tied on points, tiebreakers would be applied in the following order:
Greater number of points earned in matches between the teams concerned;
Greater goal difference in matches between the teams concerned;
Greater number of goals scored away from home in matches between the teams concerned;
Reapply first three criteria if two or more teams are still tied;
Greater goal difference in all group matches;
Greater number of goals scored in group matches;
Greater number of goals scored away in all group matches;
Drawing of lots.

Groups
The matchdays were August 5–7, August 19–21, August 26–28, September 16–18, September 23–25, and October 21–23, 2014.

All times U.S. Eastern Daylight Time (UTC−4)

Group 1

Group 2

Group 3

Group 4

Group 5

Group 6

Group 7

Group 8

References

External links
CONCACAF Champions League , CONCACAF.com

2